Women's fiction is an umbrella term for women centered books that focus on women's life experience that are marketed to female readers, and includes many mainstream novels or women's rights books. It is distinct from women's writing, which refers to literature written by (rather than promoted to) women. There exists no comparable label in English for works of fiction that are marketed to men.

The Romance Writers of America organization defines women's fiction as, "a commercial novel about a woman on the brink of life change and personal growth. Her journey details emotional reflection and action that transforms her and her relationships with others, and includes a hopeful/upbeat ending with regard to her romantic relationship."

The Women's Fiction Writers' Association gives a broader and more inclusive definition, in which romance elements are not mandatory: "Our stories may include romance, or they may not. They can be contemporary or historical and have magical, mystery, thriller, or other elements. Whereas the driving force of a romance novel is a love story, a mystery's is the exposure of an event, a thriller's is a fear-inducing chase or escape, etc., the driving force of women's fiction is the protagonist's journey toward a more fulfilled self. 

"Women's fiction as defined by WFWA is reflected in our guiding statement: Women's Fiction Writers Association is an inclusive organization of writers creating layered stories in which the plot is driven by the main character’s emotional journey."

See also 
 Gynocriticism
 List of modernist women writers
 List of women's magazines
 List of women writers
 Women's writing (literary category)
 Chick lit

References

External links 
The International Women's Fiction Festival
Craig, Lisa. "Women's Fiction vs. Romance: A Tale of Two Genres."